Zidane Mebarakou (born 3 January 1989) is an Algerian footballer who plays as a defender for CS Constantine in the Algerian Ligue 1.

Career
In 2016, he joined MC Alger.
In 2019, he joined Al-Wehda.
In 2019, he rejoined MC Alger.
In 2020, he joined CS Constantine.

References

External links

1989 births
Living people
Association football defenders
Algerian footballers
Algerian expatriate footballers
MC Alger players
JSM Béjaïa players
MO Béjaïa players
Algerian Ligue Professionnelle 1 players
Expatriate footballers in Saudi Arabia
Algerian expatriate sportspeople in Saudi Arabia
Saudi Professional League players
Al-Wehda Club (Mecca) players
21st-century Algerian people